2-Methyl-2-heptanethiol is an organic compound classified as a thiol. It is a straw-colored liquid with a strong, obnoxious odor.

It is used as a lubricant additive and in polymer modification. The chemical is one of the tertiary aliphatic mercaptans (thiols) synthesized from petroleum, as described in a 1950 paper. Initial research postulated they could be used as lubricant additives, ore flotation collectors, vulcanization accelerators, fungicides, and nonionic detergents.

References 

This article contains public domain text from the NOAA.

Alkanethiols
Foul-smelling chemicals